State Route 520 (SR 520), also known as the South Georgia Parkway, is a  state highway in the southern part of the U.S. state of Georgia. It travels from the Alabama state line, at the Chattahoochee River, on the Phenix City, Alabama–Columbus, Georgia line, to Jekyll Island. It has many concurrencies along its path, including U.S. Route 280 (US 280) from the Alabama state line to Richland; US 27 from Columbus to Cusseta; and especially US 82 from Dawson to a point southwest of Brunswick.

Route description

Columbus to Albany
SR 520 begins at the Alabama state line concurrent with US 280. On the Alabama side of the state line, US 280 is concurrent with unsigned Alabama State Route 38. On the Georgia side of the state line, US 280/SR 520 head east through Columbus to an intersection with US 27/SR 1. The four highways head southeast through the city, along Victory Drive to an interchange with Interstate 185 (I-185), and through Fort Benning. Southeast of Fort Benning, the four highways have an intersection with SR 26 just prior to entering Cusseta. In town, US 27/SR 1 split from the concurrency, toward Lumpkin, while US 280/SR 520 head southeast to Richland. Here, the two highways intersect SR 27, with US 280 heading east along SR 27. SR 520 heads southeast alone, intersecting SR 41 in Weston, before reaching Dawson. In Dawson, there is an intersection with SR 45, which begins a short concurrency with SR 520. A short distance later is an intersection with SR 32, followed by US 82/SR 45/SR 50, where the concurrency with SR 45 ends and the one with US 82 begins. Just before leaving town, US 82/SR 520 intersect SR 55. The two highways head southeast until they reach Albany.

Albany to Tifton
At the beginning of Albany, the two highways become a freeway known as Liberty Expressway. At the intersection with US 19/SR 3, which join the concurrency, US 19 Business/US 82 Business/SR 520 Business head south into downtown Albany. At the next exit is SR 91/SR 133. SR 133 joins the concurrency at this point. The five highways curve to the south, where US 82/SR 520 head east along with SR 300. Here, US 19/SR 3/SR 133/SR 300 continue south on the expressway. Just east of Albany, SR 300 leaves the concurrency to the northeast. US 82/SR 520 then intersect US 82 Business/SR 520 Business, where they both meet their eastern terminus. The concurrency heads to Sylvester. There, they meet SR 313, SR 33, and SR 112. The two routes continue easterly to Tifton.

Tifton to Waycross
Just after entering Tifton, the two routes meet I-75, before intersecting US 319/SR 35. In the downtown part of the town is US 41/SR 7/SR 125. After leaving the town, US 319/SR 35 leave the concurrency, while US 82/SR 520 continue to the east-southeast. Prior to entering Alapaha, the concurrent highways intersect US 129/SR 11. These highways join the concurrency until they leave in town about  later. Farther to the east, in Willacoochee, US 82/SR 520 intersect SR 90 and then have a very brief concurrency with SR 135. In Pearson, the concurrency intersects US 221/US 441/SR 31/SR 64. Just prior to entering Waresboro is an intersection with SR 158. About  after the beginning of the US 1/US 23/SR 4 concurrency is SR 122. Then, the concurrency enters Waycross.

Waycross to Jekyll Island

Approximately  later, US 1/US 23/SR 4 depart to the southeast, while US 82/SR 520 head to the east. At this same intersection, US 1 Business/US 23 Business/SR 4 Business head to the northwest. Southeast of Waycross is SR 177, which leads to Laura S. Walker State Park and the Okefenokee Swamp. In Hoboken, is an intersection with SR 15/SR 121. Farther to the east, in Nahunta is US 301/SR 23. In Atkinson is an intersection with SR 259 and a very brief concurrency with SR 110. Approximately  later, US 82/SR 520 meet the western terminus of SR 99. Then, just before meeting I-95, is an intersection with US 17/SR 25, along with SR 303. This intersection marks the eastern terminus of US 82. US 17/SR 25/SR 520 head southeast until SR 520 splits to the southeast, along Jekyll Island Causeway, while US 17/SR 25 head north to Brunswick. SR 520 crosses the Jekyll River onto Jekyll Island and terminates at Beach View Drive.

Miscellaneous notes

While not part of the Appalachian Development Highway System, SR 520 is nevertheless designated as Corridor Z. To emphasize the special designation, SR 520 route markers have a green background and numbers as opposed to black, which is normally used on state Route markers. Some markers also feature the small abbreviation "CORR Z" near the top of the state outline, though this practice is being phased out.

All of SR 520 from the Alabama state line to at least the eastern intersection with US 17/SR 25 near Jekyll Island is part of the National Highway System (NHS), a system of routes determined to be the most important for the nation's economy, mobility and defense.

History

Prior to designation
The roadway that would eventually become SR 520 was established in 1920 as SR 1 from Columbus to Cusseta, SR 32 from Dawson to Sylvester, and SR 46 from Sylvester to Tifton. In 1921, SR 55 was established along a route from Louvale, at an intersection with SR 1 to Dawson, and SR 50 was established along a stretch of highway from Dawson in the west, to at least as far as Waynesville, at an intersection with SR 27, in the east. Nearly all of SR 55, and all of that stretch of SR 50, were eventually utilized by SR 520. By 1926, a portion of SR 1 southeast of Columbus and a portion of SR 50 west of Sylvester were paved. Also, US 84 was designated along the portion of SR 50 east of Waycross. Sometime around 1926, SR 27 was redesignated as SR 25. By January 1932, US 280 was designated along SR 1 from Columbus to Cusseta and SR 55 from Cusseta to Richland. All of US 280/SR 1 and nearly all of US 280/SR 55 were paved. Also, a portion of SR 55 northwest of Dawson was paved. Almost all of SR 50 from Dawson to Tifton was paved, along with a portion west of Waycross, and the entirety of US 84/SR 50 east of the city. During October of that year all of US 280/SR 55 was paved. By May 1933, a portion of SR 55 between Alapaha and Willacoochee was paved. In June, a small portion of SR 55 southeast of Richland was paved. By October 1934, a portion of SR 50 east of Tifton, as well as one west of Alapaha, was paved. By January 1935, US 27 was designated along US 280/SR 1 from Columbus to Cusseta. By October 1935, all of SR 55 between Richland and Dawson was paved. By July 1936, all of SR 50 from Tifton to Willacoochee was paved. Also, nearly all of SR 50 east of Pearson was paved. By July 1937, all of the highway that would eventually become SR 520 between Columbus and Willacoochee was paved. By October 1939, the last pieces of the highway were paved. In 1948, US 82 entered the state, running concurrent with SR 50 only as far east as Waycross. In addition, SR 50 was extended, and paved, east to Jekyll Island.

After designation
In 1988, SR 520 was designated along its entire current length, with SR 55 between Richland and Dawson and SR 50 from Dawson to Jekyll Island being decommissioned. In 1989, the sections of US 82 and US 84 east of Waycross were swapped, presumably to make travel less confusing for drivers.

On May 5, 2006, the American Association of State Highway and Transportation Officials (AASHTO) Special Committee on U.S. Route Numbering designated the portion of SR 520 east of US 17 as Interstate 50 for one day, May 7. AASHTO held their Spring 2006 meeting on Jekyll Island and approved the I-50 designation in conjunction with a vintage car ride to be held on May 7 in celebration of the 50th anniversary of the Interstate Highway System.

Major intersections

Related routes

Cusseta business loop

State Route 520 Business (SR 520 Bus.) was a business route of SR 520 that existed entirely within the city of Cusseta. It followed Broad Street through the city.

The road that would become SR 520 Bus. was established in 1972 as SR 55 Business, when the road that is now SR 520 was established as part of SR 55. In 1988, the same year that SR 520 was designated in Georgia, and SR 55 was decommissioned, SR 55 Bus. was redesignated as SR 520 Bus. In 2004, SR 520 Bus. was removed from the state highway system.

Albany business loop

State Route 520 Business (SR 520 Bus.) is a business route of SR 520 that exists almost entirely within the city limits of Albany. It follows North Slappey Boulevard and East Oglethorpe Boulevard through the city, and Sylvester Road east of the city. SR 520 Bus. travels entirely concurrently with US 82 Bus. and also has a concurrency with both US 19 Bus. and, briefly, with SR 234.

See also

References

External links
 
 Corridor Z - South Georgia Parkway (State Route 520) on The Unofficial Georgia Highways Web Page
 Georgia State Route 520 on State-Ends.com

520
U.S. Route 82
Transportation in Muscogee County, Georgia
Transportation in Chattahoochee County, Georgia
Transportation in Stewart County, Georgia
Transportation in Webster County, Georgia
Transportation in Terrell County, Georgia
Transportation in Dougherty County, Georgia
Transportation in Worth County, Georgia
Transportation in Tift County, Georgia
Transportation in Berrien County, Georgia
Transportation in Atkinson County, Georgia
Transportation in Ware County, Georgia
Transportation in Brantley County, Georgia
Transportation in Glynn County, Georgia